The Dubnica Monastery ( is a Serbian Orthodox monastery located in Božetići, in southwestern Serbia. It is ecclesiastically part of the Eparchy of Mileševa. It was built in the mid-17th century by Serbian Patriarch Gavrilo I (1648–1655).

Geography
The monastery is located in the village of Božetići, between Zlatar and Javor mountains, next to the Nova Varoš-Ivanjica road.

History
It was built in the mid-17th century by Serbian Patriarch Gavrilo I (1648–1655), who hailed from the village of Štitkovo. It was later destroyed by the Ottomans.

Restoration
After research and conservation work undertaken by experts from the Institute for Protection of Cultural Monuments of Kraljevo, restoration of the monastery began in September 2003, with help of the Eparchy of Mileševa, the Municipal Assembly Nova Varoš, villagers and donor headed by Mićo Zorić, chairman of the building committee for the restoration.  The monastery foundation of the demolished church, according to the project architect Veljko Vucković, was built with stone and rubble by stonecutter Milijan Djoković from Sirogojno and his group of masters.  The interior was worked by wood-carver Miroslav Trbušić from Kragujevac, and the icons and iconostasis were painted by iconographer Ivan Kovalčik Mileševac from Novi Sad.

Restoration of the monastery Dubnica ended August 4, 2007, on the feast day of St. Mary Magdalene, with the act of consecration was done by bishop Filaret Mićević and the monastic brotherhood of the Eparchy of Mileševa.

See also
 List of Serbian Orthodox monasteries

References

Sources
Easter of Patriarch endowment
After three centuries the bells rang in Dubnica
In Božetići been reconstructed monastery Dubnica

External links

17th-century Serbian Orthodox church buildings
Serbian Orthodox monasteries in Serbia
2007 establishments in Serbia
Destroyed churches
Zlatibor District
Rebuilt buildings and structures in Serbia
Former churches in Serbia